Ndoda Mthethwa (born 9 September 1987) is a Swaziland international footballer who plays as a striker. As of February 2010, he plays for Manzini Wanderers and has won four caps and scored one goal for his country.

External links

1987 births
Living people
Swazi footballers
Eswatini international footballers

Association football forwards